Ted Smith may refer to:

Ted Smith (American football), All-American football player at Ohio State University
Ted Smith (art director) (1886–1949), American art director
Ted Smith (conservationist) (1920–2015), British conservation pioneer and English teacher
Ted Smith (cyclist) (1928–1992), American Olympic cyclist
Ted Smith (environmentalist) (born 1945), founder of the Silicon Valley Toxics Coalition
Ted Smith (footballer, born 1880) (1880–1954), English Footballer
Ted Smith (footballer, born 1902) (1902–1976), English footballer
Ted Smith (footballer, born 1914) (1914–1989), English football player and coach
Ted Smith (footballer, born 1935), Australian football (soccer) player
Edwin Smith (rower) (1922–1997), also known as Ted, New Zealand rower
Ted Smith Aerostar
Ted R. Smith (1906–1976), aircraft designer
Ted Smith (Australian footballer) (1887–1960), Australian rules footballer
Ted Smith (footballer, born 1996), English footballer

See also
Teddy Smith (1932–1979), American jazz musician
Ed Smith (disambiguation)